The COVID-19 pandemic in São Tomé and Príncipe is part of the worldwide pandemic of coronavirus disease 2019 caused by severe acute respiratory syndrome coronavirus 2. The virus was confirmed to have reached São Tomé and Príncipe on 6 April 2020. The first death was recorded on 30 April.

Background 
On 12 January 2020, the World Health Organization (WHO) confirmed that a novel coronavirus was the cause of a respiratory illness in a cluster of people in Wuhan City, Hubei Province, China, which was reported to the WHO on 31 December 2019.

The case fatality ratio for COVID-19 has been much lower than SARS of 2003, but the transmission has been significantly greater, with a significant total death toll. Model-based simulations indicate that the 95% confidence interval for the time-varying reproduction number Rt of São Tomé and Príncipe was below 1.0 in May and June 2020 but has since increased to around 1.

Timeline

April to June 2020
 On 6 April, the first four cases in the country were confirmed.

 On 30 April, the first death was reported. At the time, São Tomé and Príncipe had 16 cases, four of which had recovered and one of which had died. The deceased was a 55-year-old man living in Cantalago. There were 11 active cases.

 In May there were 279 new cases and 9 deaths, bringing the total number of confirmed cases to 295 and the death toll to 10.

 In June there were 99 new cases and one death, bringing the total number of confirmed cases to 394 and the death toll to 11.

July to September 2020
 There were 477 new cases and four deaths in July, bringing the total number of confirmed cases to 871 and the death toll to 15. There were 78 active cases at the end of the month.

 There were 25 new cases in August, bringing the total number of confirmed cases to 896. The death toll remained unchanged. There were 30 active cases at the end of the month.

 There were 15 new cases in September, bringing the total number of cases to 911. The death toll remained unchanged. The number of recovered patients increased to 885, leaving 11 active cases at the end of the month.

October to December 2020
 There were 34 new cases in October, bringing the total number of cases to 945. The death toll increased to 16. The number of recovered patients increased to 904, leaving 25 active cases at the end of the month.

 There were 46 new cases in November, bringing the total number of cases to 991. The death toll rose to 17. The number of recovered patients increased to 933, leaving 41 active cases at the end of the month.

 There were 23 new cases in December, taking the total number of cases to 1014. The death toll remained unchanged. The number of recovered patients increased to 971, leaving 26 active cases at the end of the month.

January to December 2021
 Vaccinations started on 15 March, initially with 24,000 doses of the Oxford–AstraZeneca COVID-19 vaccine obtained through COVAX.

 There were 243 new cases in January, 529 in February, 435 in March, 71 in April, 52 in May, 22 in June, 88 in July, 154 in August, 851 in September, 255 in October, 17 in November, and 166 in December. The total number of cases stood at 1257 in January, 1786 in February, 2221 in March, 2292 in April, 2344 in May, 2366 in June, 2454 in July, 2608 in August, 3459 in September, 3714 in October, 3731 in November, and 3897 in December.

 The number of recovered patients stood at 1023 in January, 1382 in February, 2482 in August, 2765 in September, 3258 in October, 3675 in November, and 3678 in December, leaving 217 active cases at the end of January, 375 at the end of February, 143 at the end of August, 644 at the end of September, 400 at the end of October, 0 at the end of November, and 162 at the end of December.

 The death toll rose to 29 in February, 34 in March, 35 in April, 37 in May, 50 in September, 56 in October, and 57 in December.

 Modelling by the Regional WHO Office for Africa suggests that due to under-reporting, the true cumulative number of infections by the end of 2021 was around one hundred thousand, and that the true number of COVID-19 deaths was around 76.

January to December 2022
 There were 1993 new cases in January, 44 in February, 14 in March, 16 in April, 27 in May, 52 in June, 72 in July, 62 in August, 59 in September, 34 in October, 8 in November, and one in December. The total number of cases stood at 5890 in January, 5934 in February, 5948 in March, 5964 in April, 5991 in May, 6043 in June, 6115 in July, 6177 in August, 6236 in September, 6270 in October, 6278 in November, and 6279 in December.

 The number of recovered patients stood at 5561 in January, 5852 in February, 5872 in March, 5884 in April, 5909 in May, 5950 in June, 6023 in July, 6077 in August, 6153 in September, 6189 in October, 6201 in November, and 6202 in December, leaving 260 active cases at the end of January, 10 at the end of February, 3 at the end of March, 7 at the end of April, 8 at the end of May, 20 at the end of June, 17 at the end of July, 24 at the end of August, 6 at the end of September, and 4 at the end of October, and none in November–December.

 The death toll rose to 69 in January, 72 in February, 73 in March, 75 in July, 76 in August, and 77 in September.

January to December 2023
 There was one new case in January  and one new case in February. The total number of cases stood at 6280 in January  and 6281 in February.

 The number of recovered patients stood at 6202 in January  and 6204 in February, leaving one active case at the end of January  and none at the end of February.

Statistics

Confirmed new cases per day

Confirmed deaths per day

Prevention
In order to prevent the spread of the virus, the government has put in place various travel restrictions and quarantining measures.

Economic impact
Tourism accounts for more than 20% of employment in the country, and with activity in the sector coming to a near-halt, the economic impact has been severe.

Cases by islands

See also 
 COVID-19 pandemic in Africa
 COVID-19 pandemic by country and territory

References

São Tomé and Príncipe
São Tomé and Príncipe
Disease outbreaks in São Tomé and Príncipe
2020 in São Tomé and Príncipe
2021 in São Tomé and Príncipe